Lorenzo Andreoli (born 15 January 2001) is an Italian football player. He plays for  club Pergolettese.

Club career
He was raised in the youth system of Brescia. He began his senior career in the 2019–20 season in Serie D on loan to Franciacorta.

For the 2020–21 season, he was loaned to Pergolettese. He made his professional debut in Serie C for Pergolettese on 27 September 2020 against Lucchese. He finished the season with 24 league appearances, 12 as a starter.

He made his Serie B debut for Brescia on 19 December 2021 in a game against Cittadella. He made his first appearance as a starter on 22 January 2022 against Ternana.

On 11 August 2022, Andreoli returned to Pergolettese on a permanent basis.

References

External links
 

2001 births
Living people
Footballers from Brescia
Italian footballers
Association football midfielders
Brescia Calcio players
U.S. Pergolettese 1932 players
Serie D players
Serie C players
Serie B players